The 60th Bodil Awards were held on 25 February 2007 in Imperial Cinema in Copenhagen, Denmark, honouring the best national and foreign films of 2006. A Soap won the award for Best Danish Film.

Winners

Best Danish Film 
 A Soap
 We Shall Overcome
 After the Wedding
 Life Hits
 Prague

Best Actor in a Leading Role 
 Nicolas Bro – Offscreen
 David Dencik – A Soap
 Rolf Lassgård – After the Wedding
 Mads Mikkelsen – Prague
 Janus Dissing Rathke – We Shall Overcome

Best Actress in a Leading Role 
 Trine Dyrholm – A Soap
 Sidse Babett Knudsen – After the Wedding
 Lene Maria Christensen – Fidibus
 Stine Stengade – Prague
 Laura Christensen, Stephanie Leon and Julie Ølgaard – Råzone

Best Actor in a Supporting Role 
Bent Mejding  – Drømmen Fridrik Thor Fridrikson – Direktøren for det hele
 Jens Jørn Spottag – Drømmen

 Best Actress in a Supporting Role 
 Stine Fischer Christensen – After the Wedding
 Mette Riber Christoffersen – Råzone
 Bodil Jørgensen – Der var engang en dreng
 Sofie Stougaard – Lotto
 Mia Lyhne – Direktøren for det hele

 Best American Film 
 Babel
 A Prairie Home Companion
 Capote'
 The Departed
 Sideways

Best Non-American Film 
 The Lives of Others
 L'Enfant
 Caché
 The Queen
 Volver

Best Documentary 
 Gasolin – Anders Østergård
 Enemies of Happiness – Eva Muldvad, Simone Aaberg Kærn
 Smiling in a War Zone – Simone Aaberg Kærn and Magnus Bejmar

Best Cinematography 
 Jørgen Johansson – Prague

Honorary Award 
 Helle Virkner

See also 

 2007 Robert Awards

References 

2006 film awards
Bodil Awards ceremonies
2007 in Copenhagen
February 2007 events in Europe